There is a significant difference between the information you need for the long term building operation, facility management, and what you need for designing and construction. The proper use of BIM in the long-term lifecycle of a property when using it, renting it, manufacturing in it etc. will not just result in tons of cost saving, but highly increases the productive performance of it.

The difference between these two BIMs are less technical, much more about what’s stored in it and how you and your employees can access and maintain it. Operational BIM is a not exaggerated but sufficiently detailed, up-to-date building documentation including barcode or RFID inventory of managed assets that is available both in the office and on site. The unique identifiers (RFID or barcode) will facilitate the processes of maintenance and operation.

The goal of operational BIM is to rationalize the use of BIM in long-term building operation and extend its use to support the productive activity of the particular facility. It has to be easily surveyed with simple and rugged tools like laser distance meters for the floor plan and barcode/RFID readers for the inventory with all required additional data – including photos. It is key important that keeping these building and asset data up-to-date must be easy, processed by the normal operational crew without significant time need from them at the place of operation/maintenance – so it can become the part of their regular work.

Another key requirement defining the success of BIM in operation is integration. Operational BIM must be embeddable to any software applications and any workflows, processes demanding building or asset data on-site or in the office. So if a maintenance person needs to find an equipment, then the floor plan or 3D model for navigating there must be available on-site, but for a decision maker to see a rental report colorized must be accessible in a simple web browser from anywhere. All this data should be accessed and modified on-site by several users at the same time. As the Operational BIM follows up every changes of a building or asset in it, it must provide the data in addition to the present also for the past, a “building history”.

The basic requirements of Operational BIM 

 Easy to produce
 Offers a 2D and 3D model of the given built environment with the required detail (typically varies from LOD100 to LOD250, in some rare cases to LOD400, element by element)
 Gives instant access to any building information anywhere without special software and knowledge
 Easy to update – low cost, rugged tools and controlled workflows
 Contains detailed asset inventory with unique identifiers (barcode or preferably RFID) on each critical element (maintenance points, production equipment, etc.)
 Provides calculated data based on the measurements carried out, automatically (e.g. surfaces, volumes or list of assets to be replaced in a renovation)
 Integrated with any systems – IWMS, CMMS, ERP, BMS – and workflow that needs building data
 Serves them all at the same time with the same fresh data
 Supports graphical reporting and any required representation of the building data
 Doesn’t add critical load on operation crew but increases their productivity

See also 
 Building information modeling

References

External links 
 CIOB - Back to Basics – The What, How and Why of BIM and FM
 Procedia Engineering Volume 118, 2015, Pages 1104-1111, J.J.McArthur - A Building Information Management (BIM) Framework and Supporting Case Study for Existing Building Operations, Maintenance and Sustainability
 OrthoGraph Operational BIM Facility and Maintenance Management technology
 Yu Chih Su, Yi Chien Lee, and Yu Cheng Lin - ENHANCING MAINTENANCE MANAGEMENT USING BUILDING INFORMATION MODELING IN FACILITIES MANAGEMENT

Construction
Architecture
Design